The discography of American guitarist and singer-songwriter Kina Grannis consists of six studio albums, one live album, and seven singles.

Albums

Studio albums

Live albums

Music videos 
"Valentine"
"Message from Your Heart"
"It's Love"
"The Goldfish Song" (Stairwells Sessions)
"The One You Say Goodnight To."
"In Your Arms"
"The Way You Are" (ft. David Choi)
"My Time with You" (ft. David Choi)
"Without Me"
"Gone"
"Dear River"
"The Fire"

Singles 
"Message from Your Heart"
"Valentine"
"The One You Say Goodnight to"
"In Your Arms"
"Gone"
"Without Me"
"This Christmas" with Destorm
"The Fire"
"Dear River"

References

Grannis, Kina